Karol Drzewiecki and Filip Polášek were the defending champions but only Drzewiecki chose to defend his title, partnering Maciej Smoła. Drzewiecki lost in the first round to Matwé Middelkoop and Hans Podlipnik Castillo.

Guido Andreozzi and Andrés Molteni won the title after defeating Middelkoop and Podlipnik Castillo 6–4, 6–3 in the final.

Seeds

Draw

References

External links
 Main draw

Pekao Szczecin Open - Doubles
2019 Doubles